Quantum on the Bay is a complex of skyscrapers in the City of Miami, Florida, United States. It is located just north of Downtown Miami in the Edgewater neighborhood. The complex consists of two main towers, the Quantum on the Bay South Tower and the Quantum on the Bay North Tower. The South Tower, the taller of the two, rises  and 51 floors high. Both towers were structurally completed in January 2008 and opened in April 2008. The towers are connected by a retail and parking center at the base. All space above the tenth floor is dedicated to residential units. The complex is located on North Bayshore Drive and Northeast 19th Street. The architect is Nichols Brosch Sandoval & Associates, Inc.

See also
List of tallest buildings in Miami
 List of tallest buildings in Florida
 Downtown Miami

References
South Tower on Emporis
North Tower on Emporis

Residential buildings completed in 2008
Residential skyscrapers in Miami
Twin towers
2008 establishments in Florida